Selište  is a village in Croatia. It is located in Sisak-Movalina, about 6 Km from Kutina. 

Populated places in Sisak-Moslavina County
Kutina